Angels & Electricity is the fourth studio album by Eddi Reader released in the UK on 11 May 1998.

The album has provided Reader with some of her most popular songs including "Kiteflyer's Hill", "Bell, Book and Candle" and "Please Don’t Ask Me to Dance".

As usual, Reader draws on a number of songwriters including "On a Whim", written for her by Ron Sexsmith, "Kiteflyer's Hill" by ex-Fairground Attraction band member Mark Nevin and long-time musical partner Boo Hewerdine.

The album was to be her last for a major record label, Blanco y Negro (Warners) and Reader would later agree a deal with UK independent label Rough Trade.

Track listing

"Kiteflyer’s Hill" (Mark E. Nevin) – 6:06
"Prayer Wheel" (Eddi Reader, Boo Hewerdine) – 4:45
"Postcard" (Eddi Reader, Calum MacColl) – 4:04
"Wings on My Heels" (Boo Hewerdine) – 4:45
"On a Whim" (Ron Sexsmith) – 3:09
"Hummingbird" (Boo Hewerdine) – 4:35
"Barcelona Window" (Eddi Reader, Boo Hewerdine) – 4:17
"Bell, Book and Candle" (Boo Hewerdine) – 4:13
"California" (Eddi Reader, Boo Hewerdine) – 4:35
"Follow My Tears" (Eddi Reader, Boo Hewerdine) – 4:54
"Psychic Reader" (Eddi Reader) – 4:13
"Please Don’t Ask Me to Dance" (Boo Hewerdine) – 3:24
"Clear" (Eddi Reader, Calum MacColl, Roy Dodds) – 4:39

Personnel

Eddi Reader – vocals, acoustic guitar
Boo Hewerdine – acoustic guitar, bells, additional vocals
Teddy Borowiecki – keyboards, melodica
Tim Harries – bass guitar
Roy Dodds – drums, percussion, hand claps, loop drumming
Johnny Scott – pedal steel, guitars, mandolin, dobro
Calum MacColl – electric, slide and high-strung guitar, dulcimer, zither, thumb piano, additional vocal
Neill MacColl – electric and acoustic guitars, bells
Graham Henderson – Hammond organ, keyboards
The Electra Strings – strings

References

1998 albums
Blanco y Negro Records albums